Cruzeiro (Portuguese meaning the Southern Cross, the Brazilian national symbol) is a municipality in the state of São Paulo in Brazil. It is part of the Metropolitan Region of Vale do Paraíba e Litoral Norte. The population is 82,571 (2020 est.) in an area of 305,70 km2.

Population history

Coat of arms

Its coat of arms features a shield with blue on the top and white at the bottom with its part of a flag in the top left and the Southern Cross which has its golden stars on the right.

Flag

Its flag colors are red on the top left with four golden stars with a white circle and its state (São Paulo) where the city is located in the middle and with 13 stripes, seven of them are blue and six of them are white.  It has a red tag reading in Portuguese Cultura Civismo meaning Civic Culture on the left, Paz meaning Peace in the middle and Liberdade e Trabalho meaning Freedom and Work on the bottom and a golden crown on the top.

Geography

Cruzeiro lies about halfway between the two largest agglomerations of Brazil: São Paulo and Rio de Janeiro. Within a radius of  around Cruzeiro, the population is around 40 million people.

The municipality contains part of the  Mananciais do Rio Paraíba do Sul Environmental Protection Area, created in 1982 to protect the sources of the Paraíba do Sul river.

Transportation

The main highways around Cruzeiro are the President Dutra Highway (BR-116, São Paulo - Rio de Janeiro) and the state highways of SP-52 (towards São Lourenço, Minas Gerais) and SP-58. Cruzeiro has a station on the main railway line from São Paulo to Rio de Janeiro, but this was closed for passenger traffic in 1998.

Distances
São Paulo - 
Rio de Janeiro - 
Caxambu - 
Campos do Jordão - 
São José dos Campos -

History

Cruzeiro was founded at the junction of the railway lines of three states (São Paulo, Minas Gerais and Rio de Janeiro). The railway, as well as coffee production were important in the 19th century, when Brazil was still an agrarian monarchy.

The first owner of what would be Cruzeiro's lands was Major Novaes, a resident of Fazenda Dona Tita, now a museum.

At the Mantiqueira railway tunnel, north of the city, an important battle between the Federalists and the Constitutionalists took place in 1932.

Nowadays, the municipality contains an economic focus on commerce, tourism, as well as metallurgical industry: e.g., former FNV (Fábrica Nacional de Vagões), now run by Maxion Rodas e Chassis, a division of an international company that produces rail components, makes up for a large part of the fragile economy.

Twin towns
Cruzeiro is twinned with
 Cobh, County Cork, Ireland

References

External links
 Official website 
 Cruzeiro on citybrazil.com.br 
 Municipal anthem of Cruzeiro 

 
Populated places established in 1901
1901 establishments in Brazil